Golujeh-ye Olya (also Romanized as Golūjeh-ye ‘Olyā) is a village in Charuymaq-e Markazi Rural District, in the Central District of Charuymaq County, East Azerbaijan Province, Iran. At the 2006 census, its population was 38, in 7 families.

References 

Populated places in Charuymaq County